George Jones Sings Bob Wills is an album by American country music artist George Jones. It was released in 1962 on the United Artists Records.

Background
George Jones Sings Bob Wills was Jones first album with United Artists after leaving Mercury Records.  1962 was a coming out of sorts for the singer; he charted seven records, the biggest being the number one smash "She Thinks I Still Care", and would establish himself as one of country music's biggest stars.  A Texas native himself, Jones was well aware of the music Bob Wills and his Texas Playboys which, in the early 1960s, ranked alongside of Hank Williams in popularity and its ability to be reinterpreted in continuously fresh fashions.  The album was produced by H.W. "Pappy" Daily, who had also been guiding Jones's career since his start in 1954.

Reception
Stephen Thomas Erlewine of AllMusic gives George Jones Sings Bob Wills a glowing review, noting "Where some Wills tributes are faithful to a fault, Jones, as produced by Pappy Daily, plays these songs as hardcore honky tonk, occasionally informed by Western swing, but only as a coloring device. He is singing these songs in his signature pure country style, and the results are pretty terrific, not only because this is the hardest country he cut at United Artists, fueled by a crackerjack band playing at its peak, but because these are tremendous songs that are open to such a sly reinterpretation as given to them by Jones and Daily."  In his 1994 article "The Devil in George Jones", Nick Tosches singled out Jones's singing on "Warm Red Wine" for particular praise, "the pure, stark sincerity with which he delivered the lament 'I'm a prisoner of drink who will never escape' that was uncommonly disquieting. It was more than a testimony to the power of his singing; it seemed a personal testament, a wail from the abyss, as well."

Track listing
"Bubbles in My Beer" (Tommy Duncan, Cindy Walker, Bob Wills) – 2:20
"Faded Love" (Johnnie Lee Wills, B. Wills) – 2:39
"Roly Poly" (Fred Rose) – 1:52
"Trouble in Mind" (Richard M. Jones) – 2:06
"Take Me Back to Tulsa" (Duncan, B. Wills) – 1:56
"The Warm Red Wine" (Walker) – 2:53
"Time Changes Everything" (Duncan) – 2:54
"Worried Mind" (Ted Daffan, Jimmie Davis) – 2:19
"Silver Dew on the Bluegrass Tonight" (Ed Burt) – 2:23
"San Antonio Rose" (B. Wills) – 2:47
"Steel Guitar Rag" (Leon McAuliffe, Cliffie Stone, Merle Travis) – 2:22
"Big Beaver" (B. Wills) – 2:36

External links
George Jones' Official Website
Record Label

1962 albums
George Jones albums
Bob Wills tribute albums
Albums produced by Pappy Daily
United Artists Records albums